Kamarband may refer to:

 Kamarband Cave, a prehistoric archaeological site in Iran
 Kamarband Shahre Kabol, a system of security checkpoints around Kabul during the Afghan War.
 Cummerbund, a type of belt